Eden Is West  is a 2009 film by Greek-French director Costa-Gavras about an illegal immigrant called Elias who tries to get to Paris. The original  title in Greek is "Paradissos sti Dysi" ("Paradise in West") and since it is a Greek-French production, the original French title is "Eden à l'ouest'. The nationality of the central hero is not disclosed because Gavras wants to make a point about the odysseys of the illegal immigrants of any nationality,  since he himself was an immigrant 50 years ago in France, before he became a well known director. His hero seems to tolerate the sea, the cold of snowy mountains and the hunger, the rapists and  robbers he meets, the cops that are after him all the time, the racists who push him aside, the  fellow immigrants who steal his clothes and in the best case the women who see him as a lover they could also take advantage of. His only comfort is his dream of Paris and, in the complexity of human condition, the good within the evil and vice versa.

Plot
Elias (Riccardo Scamarcio) is an immigrant in his twenties who tries to get to Europe by a boat along with other illegal immigrants. When the boat is near the Greek shores and they hope they will soon  disembark, a marine patrol approaches and  Elias jumps into the sea in order to avoid arrest. So do the other people in the boat. He wakes up next morning in a shore with nudists, which is not so bad after all, since he has lost some of his clothes while he was swimming for quite a few hours. He pretends to be a nudist himself, steals some clothes and he pretends he is an employee of the hotel "Eden Club-Paradise". Some residents consider him to be an employee and some others a client like themselves. He meets a magician (Ulrich Tukur) who hires him for a few tricks and since Elias is fairly good, Nick Nickelby, as the magician is called in the movie, tells him "if you find yourself in Paris, come and find me". Elias considers it an invitation and a great opportunity. Going to Paris becomes an obsession.

In the meantime nasty things happen to him: he is raped by the manager of the hotel and in another occasion he is obliged to clean a toilet with his hands because a tenant considers him to be a plumber. He also happens to witness the arrest of a friend of his, an illegal immigrant, who is discovered hiding near the hotel. He also sees the dead bodies of two immigrants who didn’t make it and drowned trying to swim to shore.

A middle-aged German woman named Christina (Juliane Köhler) wants him as her lover and offers him refuge in her room. She also gives him money. He leaves the "Eden Club" and tries to travel to Paris by hitch-hiking, without realising how far it is. A man takes advantage of his ignorance and says he will take him to Paris as long as he shares the expenses. Elias wants to prove he can afford it and shows an envelope where he keeps his money. The man steals his money and leaves. A peasant woman passes by with her tractor and takes Elias to her home; there he helps her sell birds and is friendly with her children. Soon after that, he leaves.

The other day he continues his hitchhiking and a couple of Greeks with a Mercedes help him, but some time later they disagree concerning his presence, quarrel and abandon him in snowy mountains. A German truck driver stops and picks him up –he also gives him a jacket. Then he finds a job in a factory, but he realises that his employer is not going to keep his promise and take care of the immigration process. Also, when he tries to eat in the same restaurant with the local employees he is pushed back and this racist episode compels him to run away again.

He ends up in a village hungry and without proper clothes. He steals a jacket but he is found out and is again on the run while somebody cries "damned gypsies".  Some gypsies think he is a gypsy and they help him picking him up with their truck. They show him the way for Paris laughing at him for his dream. When he leaves he sees two other trucks approaching the encampment and questioning the gypsies where the thief they’ve just helped is hiding. They are friends of the man from whom he had stolen the jacket. They leave after they throw a petrol bomb in one of their trailers.

Elias, on the run again, finds himself in a village where he meets a compatriot. This is the only time that his mother language is heard. The other immigrant is disillusioned from the "West" and says he is heading back to his country, because there are no jobs in Paris, he  does not have any savings, and life back home seems better. He sleeps in a refuge with other homeless people, who steal his jacket. The next day he is heading for Paris and finds club "Lido".

Finally he finds the magician giving a performance from a beautiful, red Citroen DS cabriolet in the street. He approaches him full of expectations and he thinks the magician recognises him. But when the show ends, the magician leaves. Elias runs after the magicians car and cries  "Mister" and when the magicians driver  stops, the young immigrant tells him "don’t you recognise me? You once told me that if I found myself in Paris, I should come and see you". The magician stares at him and says "Aha, so you’ve done both. You came in Paris and you also saw me". He then gives him a small toy magic wand and leaves. Elias, embarrassed, points the wand awkwardly toward the Eiffel Tower and by chance the lights on the Tower are lit. Thus, he thinks that indeed this is a magic wand. When many police officers appear, he is scared. He points the magic wand at them, but nothing happens. He puts the wand in his pocket and starts walking toward the gleaming Eiffel Tower.

Cast
 Riccardo Scamarcio as Elias
 Juliane Köhler as Christina
 Ulrich Tukur as Nick Nickleby
 Anny Duperey as Nice woman
 Mona Achache as Marie-Lou
 Bruno Lochet as Yann
 Antoine Monot, Jr. as Karl
 Eric Caravaca as the assistant manager of the hotel
  as Le chanteur / musicien
 Ieroklis Michailidis as L'homme du couple dans la Mercedes
 Michel Robin as The Lido's doorman
 Konstantinos Markoulakis as Yvan
 David Lowe as Fred
 Tasos Kostis as Le chauffeur voleur

Awards
The film was shown in Berlin Festival  2009 and won the critics award in the festival of «City of Lights, City of Los Angeles" (COLCOA)

References

External links
 

2009 films
2000s French-language films
Films directed by Costa Gavras
2009 drama films
French drama films
Greek drama films
Films about immigration
Films shot in Paris
2000s French films